The 2017–18 season is the 47th season in the existence of Paris Saint-Germain Féminine and the club's 31st season in the top flight of French football. In addition to the domestic league, they participated in this season's edition of the Coupe de France Féminine. Despite reaching the previous season's final, PSG did not achieve a high enough league finish in 2016-17 to qualify for the UEFA Women's Champions League.

Despite again failing to beat Lyon to the domestic title, the season was marked by its unusual end as manager Patrice Lair left the club seventy-two hours before their Coupe de France final against Lyon to take the same position at Niort. Assistant manager and former PSG right-back Bernard Mendy took over an interim basis and helped the club secure their second major trophy in history by winning the Coupe de France for the first time since 2009-10. The winning goal was scored by Marie-Antoinette Katoto, a young French attacker. In addition to a first piece of silverware for eight seasons, PSG also secured a return qualification to the Champions League for the 2018–19 season as a result of their second place league finish.

Competitions

Overall record

Division 1 Féminine

League table

Results summary

Results by round

Coupe de France

References

Paris Saint-Germain Féminine seasons